The 2018 Bretagne Classic Ouest–France was a road cycling one-day race that took place on 26 August 2018 in France. It was the 82nd edition of the Bretagne Classic Ouest–France and the 32nd event of the 2018 UCI World Tour. It was won for a second time by Oliver Naesen, winning the sprint ahead of Michael Valgren and Tim Wellens.

Result

References

2018 UCI World Tour
2018 in French sport
2018
August 2018 sports events in France